Butterfly Kiss (alternative title Killer on the Road) is a 1995 British film, directed by Michael Winterbottom and written by Frank Cottrell Boyce. It stars Amanda Plummer and Saskia Reeves. The film was entered into the 45th Berlin International Film Festival.

Plot
Set on the bleak motorways of Lancashire, Butterfly Kiss tells the story of Eunice, a bisexual serial killer, and Miriam, a naive, innocent and lonely young girl who falls under her spell.

Miriam runs away from home and meets Eunice, and soon becomes her lover and accomplice. At a truck stop, Eunice first offers the unwilling Miriam to a trucker for sex, then rescues her in mid-rape by murdering the driver. When the hitchhiking duo are picked up by another licentious man, Miriam returns to their motel room to find Eunice and their benefactor having rough sex in the shower. Mistaking the consensual sex for the rape from which Eunice earlier rescued her, Miriam returns the favor by beating their benefactor to death with the hand-held showerhead, to Eunice's delight. Eunice finally brings Miriam to the ocean, where she makes Miriam kill her.

Main cast

Soundtrack 
 "Walkin' Back To Happiness" Helen Shapiro 
 "I Will Survive"  Gloria Gaynor 
 "Ridiculous Thoughts"  The Cranberries 
 "You Won't Find Another Fool Like Me"   The New Seekers
 "Silly Games"   Janet Kay
 "Away"  The Cranberries 
 "Leavin' On Your Mind"  Patsy Cline
 "Trouble"   Shampoo 
 "There's More To Life Than This"  Björk 
 "I Don't Need"  The Cranberries
 "Stay"  Shakespeare's Sister
 "Missed" PJ Harvey
 "Jewel"  Marcella Detroit
 "World In Motion"  New Order
 "No Need To Argue"' The Cranberries

Reception
Film critic Roger Ebert, in a positive review, noted that the characters' names are shortened to "Mi" and "Eu" throughout the film, suggesting that they may represent "parts of a schizophrenic personality."

Variety called it "An often breathtakingly original meld of road movie, lesbian love story, psychodrama and black comedy".

Andrew Billen praised the dialogue in what he described as "a lesbian Thelma And Louise set on the M6".

See also
 Aileen Wuornos

References

External links
 
 

1995 films
British drama road movies
1990s drama road movies
1990s English-language films
British LGBT-related films
Lesbian-related films
British neo-noir films
1990s serial killer films
British serial killer films
Films with screenplays by Frank Cottrell-Boyce
Films directed by Michael Winterbottom
LGBT-related drama films
1995 drama films
1995 LGBT-related films
1990s British films
1995 directorial debut films